Occult Chemistry: Investigations by Clairvoyant Magnification into the Structure of the Atoms of the Periodic Table and Some Compounds (originally subtitled A Series of Clairvoyant Observations on the Chemical Elements) is a book written by Annie Besant and C.W. Leadbeater, who were both members of the Theosophical Society based in Adyar, India. Besant was at the time the President of the Society having succeeded Henry Olcott after his death in 1907.

Overview

The first edition reprinting articles from The Theosophist was published in 1908, followed by a second edition edited by Alfred Percy Sinnett in 1919, and a third edition edited by Curuppumullage Jinarajadasa in 1951.

Since the first edition was published in 1908, the book is in the public domain, and available in whole or in excerpts, on many sites on the internet.

Occult Chemistry states that the structure of chemical elements can be assessed through clairvoyant observation with the microscopic vision of the third eye. Observations were carried out between 1895 and 1933. "The book consists both of coordinated and illustrated descriptions of presumed etheric counterparts of the atoms of the then known chemical elements, and of other expositions of occult physics."

Critical reception

Academic criticism is available in Chapter 2 of Modern Alchemy: Occultism and the Emergence of Atomic Theory, and in an online article from the Chemistry department at Yale University.

Critics regard the book to be an example of pseudoscience. According to Philip Ball, most scientists did not take the book seriously.

See also 
 Clairvoyance
 How Theosophy Came to Me
 Thought-Forms

References

Further reading
Besant, Annie; Leadbeater, Charles. (1919 edition). Occult Chemistry: Clairvoyant Observations On the Chemical Elements. Theosophical Publishing House.
Morrisson, Mark. (2007). Modern Alchemy: Occultism and the Emergence of Atomic Theory. Oxford University Press.
Phillips, Stephen. (1980). Extrasensory Perception of Quarks. Theosophical Publishing House.

External links 

Abstract from the Journal of Scientific Exploration
Concerning the Occult Chemistry Researches
Basis for Ether Sciences – Bases des Sciences de l'Ether

1908 non-fiction books
Books about the paranormal
Theosophical texts
Alchemical documents
Collaborative non-fiction books